Eleven ships of the Royal Navy have borne the name HMS Porpoise, after the marine mammal, the porpoise:
  was a 16-gun sloop, formerly Annapolis, purchased in 1777. She was renamed HMS Firebrand in 1778 and was burnt off Falmouth in 1781.
  was a 14-gun storeship purchased in 1780 and sold in 1783.
  was also a storeship, launched in 1798, renamed HMS Diligent in 1801 and sold in 1802.
  was a 10-gun storeship, formerly the Spanish sloop Infanta Amelia.  captured her in 1799 off Portugal; Porpoise was wrecked in 1803 off New South Wales.
  was a 10-gun storeship, formerly Lord Melville, launched in 1804. The Admiralty purchased her that same year and sold her in 1816. As the mercantile Lord Melville she made two voyages to Australia transporting convicts; he was last listed in 1820. 
  was a mortar vessel launched in 1855.  She was renamed MV 8 later that year and hulked in 1866, before being sold in 1885.
  was a wood screw , launched in 1856 and broken up in 1864. 
  was an  launched in 1886 and sold in 1905.
  was an  launched in 1913 and sold to the Brazilian Navy in 1920, who renamed her Maranhão.
  was a  launched in 1932.  She served in the Second World War and was sunk in 1945.
  was a Porpoise-class diesel patrol submarine launched in 1956 and sunk as a target in 1985.

References

Royal Navy ship names